The Ultimate Master P is the third compilation album released by rapper Master P. It was his first compilation album released through Koch Records and featured songs from Good Side, Bad Side, Ghetto Bill and TRU's The Truth. The track "Act a Fool" peaked at No. 91 on the Billboard Hot R&B/Hip-Hop Singles & Tracks chart.

Track listing

References 
Master P at Discogs

2006 compilation albums
Master P albums
E1 Music compilation albums